OTO Award Male Singer

Currently held by  Adam Ďurica

First awarded  | Last awarded 2000 | Present 

OTO Award for Male Singer has been annually presented in Slovakia from 2000.

Winners and nominees

2000s

2010s

Superlatives

 Notes
† Denotes also a winner of the Absolute OTO category.

References

External links
 OTO Awards (Official website)
 OTO Awards - Winners and nominees (From 2000 onwards)
 OTO Awards - Winners and nominees (From 2000 to 2009)

Singer,male
Slovak culture
Slovak television awards
Awards established in 2000